Greater Quad Cities, IA/IL is a nickname for the Davenport–Moline–Clinton, Muscatine, IA–IL Combined Statistical Area, an area that is made up of four counties in Iowa and three in Illinois. The statistical area includes one metropolitan areas and two micropolitan area. As of the 2010 Census, the CSA had a population of 471,551 (though a March 2017 estimate placed the population at 472,153).

The area consists of the:
 Quad Cities Metropolitan Area, population 383,681.
 Clinton, IA Micropolitan Statistical Area, population 48,420.
 Muscatine, Iowa micropolitan area, population 54,118.

Counties

In Iowa
 Scott County pop. 170,385
 Clinton County pop. 48,420
 Muscatine County pop. 42,836
 Louisa County pop. 11,282

In Illinois
 Rock Island County pop. 147,258
 Henry County pop. 49,860
 Mercer County pop. 16,178

Communities
The communities (both incorporated and unincorporated) in the combined statistical area are as follows:
In Iowa

In Illinois

Education institutes

Higher education
Eastern Iowa Community Colleges

Primary and secondary education

Transportation

Airports
Below is a list of the airports in the greater area, followed by their number of enplanements (commercial passenger boardings) that occurred at the airport in calendar year 2013.

Public
 Quad City International Airport , 49,170
 Davenport Municipal Airport , 28,251
 Muscatine Municipal Airport , 14,106
 Clinton Municipal Airport , 14,106

Interstates
  Interstate 80
  Interstate 74
  Interstate 88
  Interstate 280

Principal Highways
  U.S. Highway 30
  U.S. Highway 61
  U.S. Highway 67
  U.S. Highway 6
  U.S. Highway 150

State Highways
  Iowa State Route 22
  Iowa State Route 38
  Iowa State Route 70
  Iowa State Route 78
  Iowa State Route 92
  Iowa State Route 130
  Iowa State Route 136
  Illinois State Route 5
  Illinois State Route 17
  Illinois State Route 78
  Illinois State Route 81
  Illinois State Route 82
  Illinois State Route 84
  Illinois State Route 92
  Illinois State Route 93
  Illinois State Route 94
  Illinois State Route 192

Shopping
Below are some notable shopping centers in the area:
 NorthPark Mall (Davenport, IA)
 SouthPark Mall (Moline, IL)
 Muscatine Mall (Muscatine, IA)

References

Davenport, Iowa
 
 
Muscatine County, Iowa
Louisa County, Iowa